Raymon Taylor Lacy (August 12, 1922 – February 10, 2020) was an American Negro league baseball player in the 1940s.

A native of Bullard, Texas, Lacy attended Stanton High School, Prairie View A&M University, Texas College and Stephen F. Austin State University. He served in the United States military during World War II, and played on various semi-pro and barnstorming teams in the 1940s. In 1947, Lacy played for the Homestead Grays, and in 1949 for the Houston Eagles. Following his baseball career, he was a high school teacher, coach and administrator in various Texas school systems. Lacy died in Wiergate, Texas in 2020 at age 97.

References

External links
 and Seamheads

1922 births
2020 deaths
Homestead Grays players
Houston Eagles players
Baseball players from Texas
People from Bullard, Texas
United States Army Air Forces personnel of World War II
United States Army Air Forces soldiers
20th-century African-American sportspeople
21st-century African-American people